Sylheti may refer to:

 Sylhetis, an Indo-Aryan ethnolinguistic group in the Sylhet division and South Assam
 Sylheti language, a language of the Sylheti region
 Sylheti Nagri, a writing system of the Sylheti region

See also
 Sylhet (disambiguation)